Ian Wallace Payne (18 July 1921 in Dunedin – 16 May 2011 in Dunedin) was a New Zealand cricketer who played for Otago in the Plunket Shield.

See also
 List of Otago representative cricketers

References

1921 births
2011 deaths
New Zealand cricketers
Otago cricketers